"Lovebreak" is a song by German deep house duo Tube & Berger. It features Milan Euringer. The remixes EP was released on 21 April 2014.

Track listing

Charts

References 

Electronic songs
2014 singles
2014 songs